Philip J. Goad is an Australian academic, currently serving as Professor of Architecture in the Faculty of Architecture, Building and Planning at the University of Melbourne. He is also a former President of the Victorian Chapter of the Royal Australian Institute of Architects. Phillip became Chair of the Heritage Council of Victoria in July 2021.

Professor Goad researches in the areas of architectural history, theory and design. He is an authority on modern Australian architecture. One of his fields of expertise is the life and work of Robin Boyd. He has been a visiting scholar at Columbia University, the Bartlett School of Architecture (London) and UCLA (Los Angeles). Professor Goad is a past editor of Fabrications, the Journal of the Society of Architectural Historians, Australia and New Zealand, and is a former contributing editor to Architecture Australia. He has also worked extensively as an architectural conservation consultant and exhibition curator. As an architect, his most notable work has been for the Melbourne firm, Edmond and Corrigan, as project architect for the RMIT Building 8 project in Swanston Street, central Melbourne.

In 2000 Professor Goad was awarded the Bates Smart Award for Architecture in the Media, from the Royal Australian Institute of Architects. In 1994 he received the Joint RAPI Award for Excellence from the Royal Australian Planning Institute (now the Planning Institute of Australia) and in 1991 he was a recipient of the RAIA President’s Award.

With Professor Julie Willis, Goad edited the Encyclopedia of Australian Architecture.

Selected publications 
 Goad PJ & Pieris AD. 2005. New Directions in Tropical Asian Architecture. Sydney, Australia: Pesaro Publishing.
 Goad, P., 2000, Architecture Bali: Architectures of Welcome, Sydney: Pesaro Publishing
 Goad PJ, Wilken RC & Willis JL. 2004. Australian Modern: the Architecture of Stephenson and Turner. Carlton, Australia: Miegunyah Press (Melbourne UP).
 Goad PJ. 2003. Judging Architecture: issues, divisions, triumphs, Victorian architecture awards 1929-2003. Melbourne, Australia: Royal Australian Institute of Architects, RAIA Victoria.
 Goad PJ. 2001. New Directions in Australian Architecture. Sydney, Australia: Pesaro Publishing.

References 

 Kleinman, R - Philip Goad comments on Docklands proposals, The Age, 29/7/06
 Profile at Penguin Books website
 Profile at University of Melbourne Press website
 Philip Goad on ABC Radio National
 Worth a Second Look Philip Goad on the ABC website
 Review of book by Philip Goad on the NGV website
 Philip Goad on Triple R FM radio

External links 
 staff webpage at the University of Melbourne

Australian architecture writers
University of Melbourne alumni
Living people
Year of birth missing (living people)
Architecture academics
Conservation architects
Australian architectural historians
20th-century Australian architects
20th-century Australian historians
21st-century Australian architects
21st-century Australian historians